Merluza could refer to one of several things

 Merlucciidae, a family of cod-like fish.
 Merluza, a character in the Japanese adult visual novel Furifuri